Bastiani may refer to:

People
Andrée Ehresmann (born Andrée Bastiani, 1935), French mathematician specialising in category theory
Giuseppe Bastiani (active in 1594), Italian painter active in the Renaissance period
Lazzaro Bastiani (1429–1512), Italian painter of the Renaissance
Monica Bastiani (born 1964), Italian basketball player

Other
Puerto Bastiani, village and municipality in Chaco Province in northern Argentina

See also
Synodontis bastiani, species of upside-down catfish native to Côte d'Ivoire and Ghana